"Visit of love" is Sachi Tainaka's seventh single and was released on January 23, 2008. "Visit of love" was used as the ending theme for the second season of Prin-ce, an entertainment program in Japan. The B-side  will be used as an insert song for the film Persona.

The CD's catalog number is GNCX-0013.

Track listing
"Visit of Love"
"With～Harunatsu Akifuyu"
"Visit of Love" -instrumental-
"With～Harunatsu Akifuyu" -instrumental-

References

2008 singles
Sachi Tainaka songs
2008 songs
Song articles with missing songwriters